Kibwe Tavares is a British film maker and architect. He is the co-founder of Factory Fifteen, a studio that uses animation and emerging technologies to understand and explain the built environment. His first short, Robots of Brixton, was awarded the 2011 Royal Institute of British Architects President's Medal. He is a 2020 TED Senior Fellow.

Early life and education 
Tavares was born in South London in the 1980s. He studied architecture at the Bartlett School of Architecture. His first short, Robots of Brixton, which was the outcome of his master's degree, was awarded the Sundance Film Festival Special Jury Award. The film explored the relationship between architecture, class and race, and showed Brixton as a disregarded area populated by London's future robotic workforce. It was awarded the Royal Institute of British Architects President's Medal in 2011. His second film was Jonah, which was inspired by The Old Man and the Sea and one of the official Sundance Film Festival selections. Jonah explored the impact of tourism on Zanzibar.

Career 
In 2011 Tavares and other Bartlett graduates established Factory Fifteen, a studio that uses animation  and emerging technologies to understand and explain the built environment. Factory Fifteen have worked with Samsung, Film4 and Formula One.

Tavares was selected as a TED Senior Fellow in 2020. His first ballet with the Royal Opera House, Aisha and Abhaya, will premiere in March that year. He is the Executive Producer of the BBC television series of Malorie Blackman's Noughts and Crosses.

Filmography 

 2011 Robots of Brixton
 2013 Jonah
 2017 Robot + Scarecrow
 2018 The Kitchen 
 2018 Time Machine

Other 

 Ballet 2020 Aisha and Abhaya
 Television 2020 Malorie Blackman's Noughts and Crosses for the BBC

Awards and honours 
His awards and honours include:

 2011 Royal Institute of British Architects President's Medal
 2011 Sundance Film Festival Special Jury Prize
 2012 Screen International Stars of Tomorrow
 2013 TED fellow
 2015 Saatchi & Saatchi New Directors Showcase
 2020 TED Senior fellow

References 

Living people
Year of birth missing (living people)
British filmmakers
People from London
Alumni of The Bartlett